"Foot in the Door" is the fourth studio album by Australian singer songwriter Russell Morris. It was credited to The Russell Morris Band. Two singles were released from the album throughout 1979, with "Hot Love" peaking at number 48. The album peaked at number 38 on the Kent Music Report.

In May 2014, the album was reissued on Compact Disc and music download by Sandman Records. and music download

Background and Release
Throughout the mid-1970s, Morris has lived and recorded in the United States of America. He returned to Australia in early 1978 and formed a touring band and hit the Australian pub circuit. He later said that he felt his artistic merit was compromised in America and upon his return to Australia, mused "It was like diving under water for five years and then finally coming back for air". 
The Australian pub circuit was in full swing in 1978 and the Russell Morris Band played frequently alongside bands such as Mondo Rock, Skyhooks, Jim Keays Band, Jo Jo Zep and newly formed Cold Chisel and Rose Tattoo. The band was signed by Michael Gudinski to Mushroom Records and recorded the track " Thunder Ground"/"Two Minute Warning" which was released in March 1979 and peaked at number 49 on the Kent Music Report. Two additional singles were released, alongside the album in 1979.
The band supported the album with a national tour and supported Santana, Eddie Money, Hall and Oats, Bob Marley and Dr. Hook on their Australian tours.

Track listing
1979 Vinyl/ Cassette

 2014 Reissue
 "Hot Love" - 3:40
 "Doctor In The House" - 3:54
 "Kidnapped" - 3:42
 "The Sky Is Falling" - 5:32
 "Your Place Or Mine" - 3:40
 "I'm Just a Writer" - 3:31
 "Next Exit" - 3:58
 "Surprise, Surprise" - 3:56
 "Love Stealer" - 3:56
 "Thunder Ground" (Bonus Non LP tracks) - 4:30
 "Two Minute Warning" (Bonus Non LP tracks) - 3:36

Charts

Release history

Credits
 Bass – Graham Thompson 
 Drums – Keith Elliott
 Engineer – Ian McKenzie 
 Keyboards – James Black 
 Lead Guitar – Joey Amenta
 Guitar - Russell Morris
 Photography By – David Parker 
 Saxophone – Bruce Sandell
 Vocals – Russell Morris, James Black, Joey Amenta, Mike Emerson

References

1979 albums
Russell Morris albums
Mushroom Records albums